James F. Mack (born 1941, Norwalk, Connecticut) is an American diplomat who was Chargé d'affaires ad interim in Ecuador from January 1992 until November 1993 and Ambassador Extraordinary and Plenipotentiary to Guyana from September 1997 until April 2000.,  After he retired from the State Department the OAS, on September 15, 2004, named him Executive Secretary of the Inter-American Drug Abuse Control Commission (CICAD).

Career
Born in Norwalk but raised in Rye, New York, he graduated with a major in government at Cornell University.  Mack entered the Foreign Service in 1966 after having served in the Peace Corps in Honduras.,

References

External links
The Association for Diplomatic Studies and Training Foreign Affairs Oral History Project AMBASSADOR JAMES F. MACK

1941 births
Ambassadors of the United States to Ecuador
Cornell University alumni
Peace Corps volunteers
People from Rye, New York
Ambassadors of the United States to Guyana
Organization of American States people
Living people
20th-century American diplomats